Etlingera brachychila is a monocotyledonous plant species first described by Henry Nicholas Ridley, and given its current name by Rosemary Margaret Smith. Etlingera brachychila belongs to the genus Etlingera and the family Zingiberaceae.

Varieties
The species is divided into the following varieties:
Etlingera brachychila var. brachychila
Etlingera brachychila var. vinosa

References

brachychila
Taxa named by Rosemary Margaret Smith